Henley-in-Arden is a railway station serving the town of Henley-in-Arden, Warwickshire, England. It is on the North Warwickshire Line between Birmingham and Stratford-upon-Avon.

History

First station and branch line
The first railway station at Henley was opened to passengers on 6 June 1894 (and to goods on 2 July 1894) at the end of a short branch line,  in length, running from Rowington Junction, near  (then known as Kingswood) on the Great Western Railway (GWR) main line from London to Birmingham. Construction of the branch line began in 1860, but was not finished because of a lack of funding. Construction was begun again in the 1890s by a new company, the Birmingham and Henley in Arden Railway, and completed in June 1894. The branch came under the control of the GWR in 1900.

On 9 December 1907 the North Warwickshire Line was opened for goods traffic; it opened to passengers on 1 July 1908. This connected Henley with a new station, and made the branch line superfluous. A short spur,  in length, was constructed to allow branch line trains to enter the new station, but the old one continued to be used for goods. The branch continued in operation until 1915, when it was closed as a wartime economy measure, and its tracks were taken up to be used for the First World War war effort. The short spur to the old station continued to be used for goods until December 1962.

Current station
The current station was opened in 1908 with the North Warwickshire Line, which then was an important main line connecting Birmingham with Cheltenham via Stratford-upon-Avon. The new station was one of the most prestigious on the new line, and was provided with three platforms. One of which was for trains terminating from Birmingham, and for a short period, trains terminating from the old branch line, until it closed.

The station today is unstaffed, and only two of the three original platforms are in use. The original station building and canopy is still extant on one platform, but is now boarded up.

A modern lift-equipped footbridge was installed at the station in 2014, the original footbridge was dismantled and donated to the heritage Gloucestershire Warwickshire Railway where it was re-erected at Broadway.

Services
The station is served by hourly local trains in each direction, between Birmingham Snow Hill and Stratford-upon-Avon, run by West Midlands Trains.

Accidents
Several accidents have taken place at both the original and present stations at Henley:
On 4 September 1899, at the original branch line station, a passenger train with four passengers on board, was approaching the station on the descending gradient, it failed to slow down, and crashed through the buffers at the end of the station; the locomotive and first coach then came to rest in a nearby meadow. The engine crew jumped off before the accident, the four passengers were on board the other coaches and were unhurt. The driver stated that the brakes failed to operate when he applied them.
Just after midnight on 25 June 1911, at the present station, an accident occurred when the signalman at Henley mistakenly believed that a train approaching the station was a local terminating train, and so set the points for the bay platform: in fact the train was the Wolverhampton to Bristol express. The express entered the bay at around 30 mph, despite the driver applying the emergency brakes, the train smashed through the buffers and overturned onto the up main line, demolishing a signal. The first two coaches were smashed, but were empty; nine of the 33 passengers on board were slightly injured. The driver and fireman were scalded when they returned to shut off the steam on the locomotive to prevent a boiler explosion.

References

External links

 Henley-in-Arden Gateway Website
Warwickshire's Railways: Historical photographs of Henley in Arden station
Rail Around Birmingham and the West Midlands: Henley-in-Arden station

Railway stations in Warwickshire
DfT Category F1 stations
Former Great Western Railway stations
Railway stations in Great Britain opened in 1908
Railway stations served by West Midlands Trains
1908 establishments in England
Henley-in-Arden